James R. "Robert" Slagle is an American computer scientist notable for his many achievements in Artificial Intelligence. Since 1984 he has been the Distinguished Professor of Computer Science at the University of Minnesota, Minneapolis, with former appointments at Johns Hopkins University, the National Institutes of Health (Bethesda, Maryland), the Naval Research Laboratory, Lawrence Radiation Laboratory, University of California and the Massachusetts Institute of Technology.

In 1961 in his dissertation at the Massachusetts Institute of Technology with Marvin Minsky, Slagle developed the first expert system, SAINT (Symbolic Automatic INTegrator), which is a heuristic program that solves symbolic integration problems in freshman calculus.

References

External links
 James R Slagle University of Minnesota

Massachusetts Institute of Technology alumni
Year of birth missing (living people)
Living people
American computer scientists
University of Minnesota faculty